The Spirit of Ireland is an album by David Arkenstone, released in 2003. It is the second of two Celtic albums by Arkenstone, the other being The Celtic Book of Days. It was recorded at The Bamboo Room, Westlake Village, California.

Track listing
"Over the Hills" – 5:50
"The Fairy Ring" – 5:20
"The Shore of Kinsale" – 4:19
"Cherish the Ladies" – 4:01
"The Festival" – 5:33
"Shadows in the Myst" – 5:22
"Song of the Silkie" – 5:20
"Morning Ride" – 4:34
"Call of the Sea" – 5:38
"Farewell to Coolmain" – 5:13
 All tracks composed by David Arkenstone / Willow Branch Publishing (BMI)

Personnel
 David Arkenstone – composer, producer, guitars, pennywhistle, mandolin, bouzouki, keyboards, percussion, accordion
 Cathy Larson – pennywhistle, flute, piccolo
 Dov – violin
 Diane Arkenstone – dulcimer, synthesizers
 Greg Howard – executive producer
 Melissa Chambers – production manager
 Matt Toth – production assistant
 Andy Norris Design – packaging design

2003 albums
David Arkenstone albums
Green Hill Productions albums